La scuola (also known as School) is a 1995 Italian comedy-drama film directed by Daniele Luchetti. It is loosely based on two books by Domenico Starnone, Ex Cattedra and Sottobanco.

The film was awarded with the David di Donatello for Best Film.

Plot 
In a grammar school in the outskirts of Rome, it's the last day of school before the summer holidays. Professor Vivaldi, Italian literature teacher, before the end bitterly remembers what happened in that year and he wonders what will happen to those young students that he cared for as children from their first day of school. But they've paid him off in a somewhat offensive way, given that, as the professor has noted, today's youth are in most cases changed, drifters and without a sense of civic duty.

Cast 
Silvio Orlando: professor Vivaldi
Anna Galiena: professoressa Majello
Fabrizio Bentivoglio: professor Sperone
Antonio Petrocelli: professor Cirrotta
Anita Zagaria: professoressa Gana
Roberto Nobile: professor Mortillaro
Enrica Maria Modugno: professoressa Lugo
Gea Martire: professoressa Ostia
 Elena Sabbatini: Daughter of professoressa Majello

Reception
The film was the third most popular Italian film in Italy for the year with a gross of 8.7 billion lire ($5.5 million) and was number one at the Italian box office for three consecutive weeks.

References

External links

1995 films
Films about educators
Films directed by Daniele Luchetti
Films set in Rome
Italian coming-of-age comedy-drama films
1990s coming-of-age comedy-drama films
1995 comedy films
1995 drama films
Italian high school films
1990s Italian-language films
1990s Italian films